This is a list of footballers who have played between 25 and 99 official matches for A.S. Roma. Generally, this means players that have played one to three season with the club.

For a list of all Roma players, major or minor, with a Wikipedia article, see :Category:A.S. Roma players; for a selected list of the best players in Roma's history, see A.S. Roma Hall of Fame. For a list of players with more than 100 matches played, see List of A.S. Roma players.

Players are listed as of 6 March 2018 and according to the date of their first-team debut for the club. Appearances and goals are for first-team competitive matches only; wartime matches are excluded. Substitute appearances included.

Players

Nationality column refers to the country (countries) represented internationally by the player, if any.

Last update: 1 August 2019

Key
 GK – Goalkeeper
 SW – Sweeper
 RB – Right back
 LB – Left back
 DF – Defender
 MF – Midfielder
 RW – Right winger
 LW – Left winger
 FW – Forward

References

 
 
 

Roma
Players
Association football player non-biographical articles